Aluminij Sports Park is a multi-purpose stadium in Kidričevo, Slovenia. It is used mostly for football matches and is the home ground of the Slovenian Second League team NK Aluminij.

During the 2016–17 season, the stadium underwent a major reconstruction. The old stand was demolished and replaced with a new one with a capacity of 600 covered seats.

References

External links
Soccerway profile

Football venues in Slovenia
Multi-purpose stadiums in Slovenia
Sports venues completed in 1950